The list of mammals of North Dakota lists all mammal species that are seen in the U.S. state of North Dakota. 87 species are known to live in the state. This includes mammals that are currently extirpated or locally extinct in North Dakota such as the gray wolf, swift fox, caribou and grizzly bear. The species on this list are grouped by order. It does not include mammals that are only found in captivity. Mountain cottontails are ranked as vulnerable in Arizona and "presumed extinct" in North Dakota (NatureServe 2015).

Marsupials

Opossums
Virginia opossum, Didelphis virginiana

Moles and shrews

Shrews
Northern short-tailed shrew, Blarina brevicauda
Least shrew, Cryptotis parva
Arctic shrew, Sorex arcticus
Masked shrew, Sorex cinereus
American pygmy shrew, Sorex hoyi
Dwarf shrew, Sorex nanus
American water shrew, Sorex palustris
Merriam's shrew, Sorex merriami - rare

Moles
Eastern mole, Scalopus aquaticus
Star-nosed mole, Condylura cristata

Bats

Vesper bats
Big brown bat, Eptesicus fuscus
Eastern red bat, Lasiurus borealis
Hoary bat, Lasiurus cinereus
Silver-haired bat, Lasionycteris noctivagans
Little brown bat, Myotis lucifugus
Northern long-eared bat, Myotis septentrionalis
Western small-footed bat, Myotis ciliolabrum
Long-legged myotis, Myotis volans
Long-eared myotis, Myotis evotis
Townsend's big-eared bat, Plecotus townsendii
Fringe-tailed bat, Myotis thysanodes - accidental

Free-tailed bats
Big free-tailed bat, Nyctinomops macrotis - accidental
Mexican free-tailed bat, Tadarida brasiliensis - accidental

Carnivores

Canids
Coyote, Canis latrans
Gray wolf, Canis lupus - extirpated
Great Plains wolf, C. l. nubilus 
Gray fox, Urocyon cineroeargenteus
Swift fox, Vulpes velox - extirpated
Red fox, Vulpes vulpes

Felids
Canada lynx, Lynx canadensis - extirpated
Bobcat, Lynx rufus
Cougar, Puma concolor

Raccoons
Raccoon, Procyon lotor

Skunks
Striped skunk, Mephitis mephitis
Western spotted skunk, Spilogale gracilis
Eastern spotted skunk, Spilogale putorius

Mustelids
Wolverine, Gulo gulo - extirpated
North American river otter, Lontra canadensis
American marten, Martes americana
Black-footed ferret, Mustela nigripes - extirpated
Least weasel, Mustela nivalis
American ermine, Mustela richardsonii 
Long-tailed weasel, Neogale frenata
American mink, Neogale vison
Fisher, Pekania pennanti
American badger, Taxidea taxus

Bears
American black bear, Ursus americanus
Brown bear, Ursus arctos - extirpated
Grizzly bear, U. a. horribilis - extirpated

Even-toed ungulates

Deers
Moose, Alces alces 
Elk, Cervus canadensis
Mule deer, Odocoileus hemionus
White-tailed deer, Odocoileus virginianus
Caribou, Rangifer tarandus - extirpated
Boreal woodland caribou, R. t. caribou - extirpated

Pronghorns
Pronghorn, Antilocapra americana

Bovids
American bison, Bison bison - reintroduced
Plains bison, B. b. bison - reintroduced
Bighorn sheep, Ovis canadensis

Lagomorphs

Rabbits
Snowshoe hare, Lepus americanus
White-tailed jackrabbit, Lepus townsendii
Desert cottontail, Sylvilagus audubonii
Eastern cottontail, Sylvilagus floridanus
Mountain cottontail, Sylvilagus nuttalii

Rodents

Beavers
American beaver, Castor canadensis

New World mice
Southern red-backed vole, Clethrionomys gapperi
Sagebrush vole, Lagurus curtatus
Long-tailed vole, Microtus longicaudus
Prairie vole, Microtus ochrogaster
Meadow vole, Microtus pennsylvanicus
Bushy-tailed woodrat, Neotoma cinerea
Muskrat, Ondatra zibethicus
Northern grasshopper mouse, Onychomys leucogaster
White-footed mouse, Peromyscus leucopus
Western deer mouse, Peromyscus sonoriensis
Western harvest mouse, Reithrodontomys megalotis
Plains harvest mouse, Reithrodontomys montanus

Porcupines
North American porcupine, Erethizon dorsatum

Pocket gophers
Plains pocket gopher, Geomys bursarius
Northern pocket gopher, Thomomys talpoides

Kangaroo rats and pocket mice
Ord's kangaroo rat, Dipodomys ordii
Plains pocket mouse, Perognathus flavescens
Olive-backed pocket mouse, Perognathus fasciatus

Old World mice and rats
House mouse, Mus musculus introduced
Norway rat, Rattus norvegicus introduced

Squirrels
Black-tailed prairie dog, Cynomys ludovicianus
Northern flying squirrel, Glaucomys sabrinus
Southern flying squirrel, Glaucomys volans
Thirteen-lined ground squirrel, Ictidomys tridecemlineatus
Yellow-bellied marmot, Marmota flaviventris
Groundhog, Marmota monax
Least chipmunk, Neotamias minimus
Franklin's ground squirrel, Poliocitellus frankinii
Fox squirrel, Sciurus niger
Eastern chipmunk, Tamias striatus
American red squirrel, Tamiasciurus hudsonicus
Richardson's ground squirrel, Urocitellus richardsonii
Spotted ground squirrel, Xerospermophilus spilosoma - accidental
Eastern gray squirrel, Sciurus carolinensis

Jumping mice
Meadow jumping mouse, Zapus hudsonius
Western jumping mouse, Zapus princeps

See also
Lists of mammals by region
Mammal classification

References

North Dakota